Heathcote is an unincorporated community and census-designated place (CDP) located within South Brunswick Township, in Middlesex County, New Jersey, United States. As of the 2010 United States Census, the CDP's population was 5,821.

Geography
According to the United States Census Bureau, the CDP had a total area of 2.592 square miles (6.712 km2), including 2.585 square miles (6.694 km2) of land and 0.007 square miles (0.018 km2) of water (0.27%).

U.S. Route 1, New Jersey Route 27, and County Route 522 all pass through Heathcote.

Demographics

Census 2010

Census 2000
As of the 2000 United States Census there were 4,755 people, 2,035 households, and 1,271 families living in the CDP. The population density was 698.1/km2 (1,810.2/mi2). There were 2,059 housing units at an average density of 302.3/km2 (783.9/mi2). The racial makeup of the CDP was 69.36% White, 10.96% African American, 0.06% Native American, 16.42% Asian, 1.07% from other races, and 2.12% from two or more races. Hispanic or Latino of any race were 4.35% of the population.

There were 2,035 households, out of which 31.4% had children under the age of 18 living with them, 50.7% were married couples living together, 9.7% had a female householder with no husband present, and 37.5% were non-families. 29.6% of all households were made up of individuals, and 3.7% had someone living alone who was 65 years of age or older. The average household size was 2.33 and the average family size was 2.94.

In the CDP the population was spread out, with 23.2% under the age of 18, 4.3% from 18 to 24, 40.1% from 25 to 44, 25.6% from 45 to 64, and 6.9% who were 65 years of age or older. The median age was 37 years. For every 100 females, there were 87.1 males. For every 100 females age 18 and over, there were 82.2 males.

The median income for a household in the CDP was $80,303, and the median income for a family was $92,020. Males had a median income of $71,014 versus $43,649 for females. The per capita income for the CDP was $40,641. About 1.4% of families and 2.4% of the population were below the poverty line, including 2.1% of those under age 18 and 1.2% of those age 65 or over.

References

Census-designated places in Middlesex County, New Jersey
South Brunswick, New Jersey